Władysław Jerzy Engel (born 6 October 1952 in Włocławek, Poland) is a Polish former footballer and coach.

Biography

Playing career
Engel began his career in football at an early age playing at local youth club Junak Wloclawek, before being promoted to local senior team Kujawiak Włocławek which allow him to move to the likes of Polonia Warsaw and several other clubs.

Engel, nicknamed "Jurek", began playing in midfield or attack before, at the age of 22, being cruelly forced to cut his career short because of injury.

Coaching and managerial career

First spell in club football
With spirits dampened only slightly, he immediately turned to coaching and took over at Polonia Warsaw reserves in the 1975/1976 season.

After a spell with third division teams, he came to the fore once more with his involvement in Poland's third-place finish in the 1982 FIFA World Cup Spain, helping then national coach, Antoni Piechniczek, choose the ideal squad.

In 1985 Jurek took over at Legia Warsaw, leading them to two second-place finishes in the Polish Championship in three seasons. Just as he was becoming well known he made the strange decision to move to Apollon Limassol, in Cyprus, an island he stayed on for seven years.

He later returned to Legia before taking Polonia Warsaw to runners-up spot in 1998–99.

National team spell
He became manager of the Polish national team in 1999 and after failing to achieve qualification for the UEFA Euro 2000, was instrumental in securing Emmanuel Olisadebe's naturalisation as a Polish national.

With the side lacking firepower when he took charge, Engel saw the qualities in Nigerian-born Olisadebe who was already playing his league football in Poland. He asked the president to speed Olisadebe's papers through and as a result, had a talented forward available for World Cup qualifying. Olisadebe rewarded his coach with eight goals in ten qualifying matches.

Engel steered Poland to their first World Cup finals tournament since 1986, when he oversaw their participation at the 2002 World Cup in South Korea and Japan.

The World Cup did not go well and Poland were eliminated in the first round. The opening two games provided two resounding defeats, losing to South Korea and Portugal. After being knocked out of the tournament and now without any pressure to perform, Poland beat the United States in their final group game for a famous victory.

Second spell in club football
His most recent vocation was at Wisła Kraków where he was trainer until late-October 2005 and he has also been sports director of Legia Warsaw. In December 2005, he moved back in Cyprus and headed the coaching team of APOEL. He led the team into the third place of the Cypriot Championship, just two points from the top, and won the Cypriot Cup as well.

Directorial career
On 25 June 2015 "Polonia Warsaw Co." under the leadership of Jerzy Engel took over the senior team from the MKS Polonia Warsaw Academy, which helped to reinstate Polonia Warsaw back from nonexistence, to the bottom-half of the 4th tier (third league) of professional football in Poland. Under "Engel's Co." the club returned to the emblem, and the sponsor from the Polish Title winning season (1999/2000).

Honours

Manager
Polonia Warszawa
 Ekstraklasa: 1999–2000

APOEL
Cypriot Cup: 2005–06

References

1952 births
Living people
Apollon Limassol FC managers
Expatriate football managers in Cyprus
Polish footballers
Polonia Warsaw players
Polish football managers
Wisła Kraków managers
Legia Warsaw managers
Poland national football team managers
2002 FIFA World Cup managers
People from Włocławek
Polish people of German descent
APOEL FC managers
Polonia Warsaw managers
Nea Salamis Famagusta FC managers
Aris Limassol FC managers
Sportspeople from Kuyavian-Pomeranian Voivodeship
Association football forwards
Hutnik Warsaw managers
APOP Paphos FC managers
Polish expatriate football managers
Polish expatriate sportspeople in Cyprus